

Places of interest

 
Dorset